The 1937 All-Pro Team consisted of American football players chosen by various selectors for the All-Pro team of the National Football League (NFL) for the 1937 NFL season. Teams were selected by, among others, the NFL coaches (NFL), the International News Service (INS), the United Press (UP), Collyer's Eye (CE), and the New York Daily News (NYDN).

Four players were selected for the first team by all five selectors: Detroit Lions quarterback Dutch Clark; Green Bay Packers fullback Clarke Hinkle; Washington Redskins tackle Turk Edwards; and Chicago Bears guard George Musso. Three others were named to the first team by four selectors: Washington Redskins Sammy Baugh (NFL, INS, UP, NYDN; selected as a halfback); Chicago Cardinals end Gaynell Tinsley (NFL, UP, CE, NYDN); and Chicago Bears tackle Joe Stydahar (NFL, UP, CE, NYDN). Three more were selected by three selectors: Washington Redskins halfback Cliff Battles (NFL, INS, NYDN); Green Bay Packers end Don Hutson (INS, CE, NYDN); and New York Giants center Mel Hein (NFL, INS, NYDN).

Team

References

All-Pro Teams
1937 National Football League season